Susanna Huckstep (born 10 June 1969 in Trieste) is the winner of the 45th edition of Miss Italia. She won the crown on 2 September 1984.

Biography 

Born in Trieste, in 1992 she was testimonial of Pierre Cardin and agree the campaign against anorexia nervosa, and testimonial Gardaland in 2003.

She married the Neapolitan manager Pietro Savarese, and they have a son, Augusto.

References

External links 

1969 births
Italian beauty pageant winners
Italian people of English descent
Living people
Miss Universe 1986 contestants
People from Trieste